The Kromme Rijn ("Crooked Rhine", for its many bends) is a river in the central Netherlands.

In Roman times, this northernmost branch of the Rhine delta was the main distributary of this major European river. Along its banks the Romans built their frontier castella part of the Limes Germanicus.

Since the Middle Ages, however, the stream lost its importance as it silted up, and eventually it is nearly cut off from the Nederrijn-Lek main artery. Yet it retained the name "Rhine".

The Kromme Rijn splits off the Nederrijn-Lek main artery at the old town of Wijk bij Duurstede (called Dorestad in the early medieval period), after which it twists and turns through the province of Utrecht, past the towns of Cothen, Werkhoven, Odijk and Bunnik, and ends in the moat of the city of Utrecht.

Originally, the city of Utrecht was built by the Romans at a ford near the place where the Kromme Rijn forks into rivers Vecht (north) and Leidse Rijn (west); the last stretch within the city walls, however, was channelised to form the Oudegracht canal. Rivers Leidse Rijn and Vecht extend from the city moat and are the continuation of the Kromme Rijn.

Rivers of the Rhine–Meuse–Scheldt delta
Rivers of the Netherlands
Rivers of Utrecht (province)
Transport in Utrecht (city)
Wijk bij Duurstede